Parliamentary elections were held in Bulgaria between 6 and 27 March 1938, the first after the 1934 coup. The elections were held on a non-partisan basis, with the Bulgarian Agrarian National Union and Bulgarian Communist Party banned. Pro-government candidates won a majority of seats. Voter turnout was 69.5%.

Women were allowed to vote – for the first time – if they were married, divorced or widowed.

Results

References

Bulgaria
Parliamentary election
Parliamentary elections in Bulgaria
Non-partisan elections
1938 elections in Bulgaria
March 1938 events